is a stadium in Kawasaki, Kanagawa, Japan. The stadium was opened in 1952 and had a capacity of 30,000 people, but was demolished and rebuilt in 2003 as an American football venue and is now the home of the Fujitsu Frontiers of the X-League.

In its first incarnation, it was primarily used for baseball and was home of the Taiyo Whales until they moved to Yokohama in 1977 and became the Yokohama Taiyo Whales. It was also home to the Takahashi Unions from 1954 to 1956, before they became the Daiei Unions, and the Lotte Orions before they moved to Chiba in 1992 and became the Chiba Lotte Marines. The venue was used by Frontier Martial-Arts Wrestling for its annual Anniversary Show from 1991 to 1997 until it was demolished in 1998. FMW returned for one more show in 2001.

References

External links
Stadium information 

Sports venues completed in 1952
Defunct baseball venues in Japan
American football venues in Japan
Sports venues in Kawasaki, Kanagawa
Defunct sports venues in Japan
1952 establishments in Japan